Uneasy Money is an American silent romantic comedy film released in 1918, starring Taylor Holmes, Virginia Valli, and Arthur W. Bates. The film is based on the 1916 novel Uneasy Money by P. G. Wodehouse. It is a lost film, with no surviving reels available.

Cast
 Taylor Holmes as Lord Dawlish
 Virginia Valli as Elizabeth Nutcombe
 Arthur W. Bates as Nutty Nutcombe
 Charles Gardner as Ira Nutcombe
 Virginia Bowker as Lady Wetherby
 Fred Tiden as Lord Wetherby
 Lillian Drew as Claire Edmont
 James F. Fulton as Mr. Pickering
 Rod La Rocque as Johnny Gates

Production
The film was produced by George K. Spoor and directed by Lawrence C. Windom.

References

External links
 

1918 films
Films based on works by P. G. Wodehouse
American black-and-white films
American silent feature films
American romantic comedy films
Essanay Studios films
1918 romantic comedy films
Films directed by Lawrence C. Windom
1910s American films
Silent romantic comedy films
Silent American comedy films
1910s English-language films